Markus Kissler-Patig (born 21 August 1970, in Switzerland) is a German astronomer, previously based at the European Southern Observatory in Garching, Germany. In August 2012, he took over as the new director of the Gemini Observatory.

He specializes in the study of star clusters and galaxies.

In 1999, he was winner of the Ludwig Biermann Award of the German Astronomical Society in recognition of his work on extragalactic globular cluster systems.

References

External links
 List of Biermann Award winners
 Markus Kissler-Patig's home page

1970 births
Living people
21st-century German astronomers
Ludwig Biermann Award winners